Corner Peak is a pyramidal peak,  high, with considerable rock exposed on its northern face. It was named by the Falkland Islands Dependencies Survey following a 1946 survey.

Map
 Trinity Peninsula. Scale 1:250000 topographic map No. 5697. Institut für Angewandte Geodäsie and British Antarctic Survey, 1996.

References 

Mountains of Trinity Peninsula